Nelson Ryan Zamora (born July 29, 1991) is a Canadian soccer player who played in the  Peruvian Primera División, Canadian Soccer League and Uruguayan Primera División.

Playing career 
Zamora began his youth career in 2007 with Universitario de Deportes in the Peruvian Primera División, Then went abroad in 2009 to Uruguay to join Liverpool Fútbol Club, In 2010 Zamora Started his Senior career with North York Astros in the Canadian Soccer League. In 2012, he went abroad to Uruguay to sign with Racing Club de Montevideo, where he primary featured in the Reserved squad. He later played with Canadian Soccer Club in the Uruguayan Segunda División. In 2014, he signed with El Tanque Sisley in the Uruguayan Primera División.

References 
 

1991 births
Living people
Canadian soccer players
North York Astros players
Canadian Soccer Club players
El Tanque Sisley players
Canadian Soccer League (1998–present) players
Uruguayan Segunda División players
Uruguayan Primera División players
Association football goalkeepers